The 2022 Reyes de Jalisco season was the Reyes de Jalisco first season in the Liga de Fútbol Americano Profesional (LFA). The team was established on 20 December 2021 as one of the two expansion teams for the 2022 LFA season, the other team being the Galgos de Tijuana. On that same date, Enrique Alfaro, who led the Mayas to the 2016 and 2017 championships, was appointed as head coach. Placekicker Gabriel Amavizca, who previously played for the CFL team Hamilton Tiger-Cats, was the first player signed by the Reyes.

Reyes finished the regular season as the fifth ranked team with a 3–3 record. The Reyes were defeated by the Raptors on the Wild Card round 6–26.

Draft

Roster

Staff

Regular season

Standings

Schedule

Postseason

Schedule

Awards
The following Reyes players were awarded at the 2022 LFA Gala.

Notes

References

2022 in American football
Reyes